Vincenzo Cammaroto (born 1 April 1983) is an Italian football coach and a former defender.

Appearances on Italian Series 

Serie C1 : 28 apps, 1 goal

Serie D : 190 apps, 4 goals

Total : 218 apps, 5 goals

References 

1983 births
People from Santa Margherita Ligure
Footballers from Liguria
Sportspeople from the Province of Genoa
Living people
Italian footballers
Association football defenders
S.S. Verbania Calcio players
F.C. Vado players
U.S. Alessandria Calcio 1912 players
A.S.D. Victor San Marino players
Forlì F.C. players
Savona F.B.C. players
U.S.D. Sestri Levante 1919 players
Serie C players
Serie D players
Italian football managers
Serie D managers